Please add names of notable painters with a Wikipedia page, in precise English alphabetical order, using U.S. spelling conventions. Country and regional names refer to where painters worked for long periods, not to personal allegiances.

Ossip Zadkine (1890–1967), Russian painter and sculptor
Kristian Zahrtmann (1843–1917), Danish painter
Eugeniusz Żak (1884–1926), Polish painter
Marcin Zaleski (1796–1877), Polish painter
Domenico Zampieri (or Domenichino) (1581–1641), Italian painter
Federico Zandomeneghi (1841–1917), Italian Impressionist painter
Zao Wou-Ki (趙無極, (1920–2013), Chinese/French painter
Harriet Zeitlin (born 1929), American painter and sculptor
Wolfgang Zelmer (born 1948), German painter and etcher
Zeng Jing (曾鯨, 1568–1650), Chinese painter
Karl Zerbe (1903–1972), German/American painter
Zha Shibiao (查士标, 1615–1698), Chinese painter and calligrapher
Zhan Ziqian (展子虔, mid to late 6th century), Chinese painter
Zhang Han (張瀚, 1511–1593), Chinese painter, scholar and official
Zhang Lu (張路, 1464–1538), Chinese painter
Zhang Sengyao (張僧繇, late 5th-6th century), Chinese ink-wash painter
Zhang Shengwen (張勝溫, fl. 1163–1189), Chinese painter
Zhang Shunzi (张舜咨, 14th century), Chinese painter, calligrapher and poet
Zhang Shuqi (张书旗, 1901–1957), Chinese painter
Zhang Wo ( 張渥, 13th century), Chinese painter
Zhang Xiaogang (張曉剛, born 1958), Chinese painter
Zhang Xuan (張萱, 713–755), Chinese painter
Zhang Yan (张彦, 16th–17th centuries), Chinese painter
Zhang Yan (张焰, born 1963), Chinese painter and director
Zhang Yin (张崟, 1761–1829), Chinese calligrapher and painter
Zhang Zeduan (張擇端, 1085–1145), Chinese painter
Zhang Zongcang (张宗苍, 1686–1756), Chinese painter
Zhao Mengfu (趙孟頫, 1254–1322), Chinese scholar, painter and calligrapher
Zhao Yong (趙雍, 1289–1360), Chinese painter
Zhao Yuan (趙原, 14th century), Chinese painter
Zhao Zhiqian (赵之谦, 1829–1884), Chinese calligrapher, painter and seal carver
Zhao Zuo, (趙左, between 14th and 16th centuries), Chinese painter
Hristofor Zhefarovich (died 1753), Ottoman (Macedonian) painter, engraver and writer
Zheng Xie (鄭燮, 1693–1765), Chinese painter
Zhou Chen (周臣, 1460–1535), Chinese painter
Zhou Fang (周昉, 730–800), Chinese painter
Zhou Jichang (周季常, fl. late 11th century), Chinese painter
Zhou Shuxi (周淑禧, 1624–1705), Chinese painter
Zhou Wenjing (周文靖, fl. pre-1463), Chinese painter
Zhu Da (八大山人, 1626–1705), Chinese ink-wash painter and calligrapher
Zhu Derun (朱德潤, 1294–1365), Chinese painter and poet
Stanislav Zhukovsky (1875–1944) Russian/Polish painter
Mihály Zichy (1827–1906), Hungarian painter and graphic artist
Félix Ziem (1821–1911), French painter
Adrian Zingg (1734–1816), Swiss painter
Franciszek Żmurko (1859–1910), Polish painter
Ernest Zobole (1927–1999), Welsh painter and art teacher
Johann Zoffany (1733–1810), German neoclassical painter
Zahari Zograf (1810–1853), Bulgarian painter
Marguerite Zorach (1887–1968), American painter, textile artist and graphic designer
William Zorach (1889–1966), Lithuanian/American sculptor, artist and writer
Anders Zorn (1860–1920), Swedish painter, sculptor and etcher/print-maker
Zou Yigui (鄒一桂, 1686–1772), Chinese painter
Zou Zhe (鄒喆, 1636–1708), Chinese painter
Larry Zox (1937–2006), American painter and print-maker
Jan Zrzavý (1890–1977), Czech painter, graphic artist and illustrator
Francesco Zuccarelli (1702–1788), Italian painter
Federico Zuccari (1543–1609), Italian painter and architect
Ignacio Zuloaga (1870–1945), Spanish (Basque) painter
Robert Zünd (1826–1909), Swiss painter
Francisco Zúñiga (1912–1998), Costa Rican/Mexican painter and sculptor
Francisco de Zurbarán or Zurbarán (1598–1664), Spanish painter

References
References can be found under each entry.

Z